Charles Oliver Iselin (June 8, 1854 – January 1, 1932) was an American banker and yachtsman who was captain of racing yachts that won the America's Cup three times.

Early life

Iselin was the son of Adrian Georg Iselin and Eleanora O Donnell Iselin. His great great-grandfather Isaac Iselin-Roulet came to America in 1801 from Basel, Switzerland, where the Iselin's had been merchants, public officials, and military and professional men since the 14th century. Isaac amassed a large fortune in the importing business, and his descendants became private bankers and philanthropists in New York City and New Rochelle, New York.

Education 
He was educated at Columbia University, graduating in 1874 with a LL.B.

Yachting
Oliver was considered to be one of the greatest American yachtsmen of his time, participating in and winning six consecutive America's Cup races: 1887, 1893, 1895, 1899, 1901 and 1903.  He built a large breakwater next to his Premium Point, New Rochelle estate All View so that he could dock his yachts Defender, Reliance and Columbia safely at home. In 1994 Oliver Iselin was inducted into the Herreshoff Marine Museum's America's Cup Hall of Fame.

Personal life
Iselin was first married to Fannie Garner (1861–1890) with whom he had a son, C. Oliver Jr. (1890-1979), who named his son, C. Oliver III (1927-2017). After her death, he married Hope Goddard (1868–1970), who was the first woman ever to serve as part of the crew on an America's Cup yacht, in 1894.

Iselin died on January 1, 1932, at Glen Head on Long Island.

Gallery

References

External links

1854 births
1932 deaths
American male sailors (sport)
America's Cup sailors
American bankers
New York Yacht Club
Sportspeople from New York City
Businesspeople from New Rochelle, New York
People from Glen Head, New York
American people of Swiss descent
Sportspeople from New Rochelle, New York
Columbia Law School alumni
Iselin family